HBO Max is an over-the-top subscription service owned and operated by Warner Bros. Discovery. It distributes a number of original films, documentaries, and specials, alongside their slate of television series. The shows produced for HBO Max are dubbed "Max Originals". Max Originals are specifically made for audiences outside the traditional baseline HBO brand, while simultaneously working in parity with the HBO library. Content that is based on new and existing properties from WarnerMedia's subsidiaries will be distributed through HBO Max.

Original films

Feature films

Documentaries

Specials

Stand-up comedy

Exclusive films 
The following films premiered on the service without being labeled as Max Originals

Upcoming original films

Feature films

Documentaries

Specials

Stand-up comedy

In development

Notes

References 

Internet-related lists
 
Warner Bros. Discovery-related lists